Ana Gonçalves is a basketball player.

Ana Gonçalves may also refer to:

Ana Gonçalves (futsal)
Ana Maria Gonçalves, Brazilian writer

See also
Ana González (disambiguation)